Herwen en Aerdt is a former municipality in the Dutch province of Gelderland. It existed from 1818 to 1985, when it became part of the new municipality of Rijnwaarden.

The municipality covered the villages Herwen and Aerdt, and the surrounding area.

Born in Herwen en Aerdt 
 Jan van Aken (b. 1961), writer
 Theo van de Klundert (b. 1936), economist

References

Former municipalities of Gelderland
Zevenaar